Eldridge Cleaver, Black Panther is an Algerian documentary film made in 1969 and directed by William Klein. The film covers Black Panther activist Eldridge Cleaver while exiled in Algeria.  Cleaver moved to Algeria after the U.S. state of California tried to charge him with intent to murder. In the documentary, Cleaver discusses revolution in the United States and denounces political figures Richard Nixon, Spiro Agnew, Ronald Reagan and Richard J. Daley.

References

External links 
 

1969 films
Creative Commons-licensed documentary films
Algerian documentary films
1969 documentary films
Documentary films about American politics
Documentary films about African Americans
Films directed by William Klein
Films about activists
Documentary films about the Black Panther Party
1960s American films